In enzymology, a methylenetetrahydrofolate dehydrogenase (NAD+) is an enzyme that catalyzes a chemical reaction.

5,10-methylenetetrahydrofolate + NAD+  5,10-methenyltetrahydrofolate + NADH + H+

Thus, the two substrates of this enzyme are 5,10-methylenetetrahydrofolate and NAD+, whereas its 3 products are 5,10-methenyltetrahydrofolate, NADH, and H+.

This enzyme belongs to the family of oxidoreductases, specifically those acting on the CH-NH group of donors with NAD+ or NADP+ as acceptor.  The systematic name of this enzyme class is 5,10-methylenetetrahydrofolate:NAD+ oxidoreductase. This enzyme is also called methylenetetrahydrofolate dehydrogenase (NAD+).  This enzyme participates in one carbon pool by folate.

Structural studies

References

 

EC 1.5.1
NADH-dependent enzymes
Enzymes of known structure